Ambinanindrano is a rural municipality in Madagascar. It belongs to the district of Ambositra, which is a part of Amoron'i Mania Region. The population of the municipality had been 21,364 in 2019.

It is situated at 60 km from Ambositra. It is a main region of sugar cane plantations of the region, rhum is its main product.
It is linked to Ambositra by the unpaved Provincial Road 3F, that is in a very bad state of conversation.

Primary and junior level secondary education are available in town. The majority 90% of the population of the commune are farmers.  The most important crop is sugarcane, while other important products are beans, cassava and rice. Services provide employment for 10% of the population.

References

Populated places in Amoron'i Mania